Opisthoteuthis is a genus of cirrate octopuses, sometimes known as flapjack octopuses, which are found in all the world's oceans.

Behavior
Like other cirrates, octopuses in Opisthoteuthis are generally small, and many dwell in the deep sea. They have cirri on their arms, internal shells to support their bodies, and muscular fins for steering. Like octopuses of Grimpoteuthis, opisthoteuthids have been seen resting or crawling on the seafloor.

Species
The following 24 species have been placed in Opisthoteuthis:

Notes

References

External links
 
 

Octopuses
Cephalopod genera